The Xerinae comprise a subfamily of squirrels, many of which are highly terrestrial. It includes the tribes Marmotini (marmots, chipmunks, prairie dogs, and other Holarctic ground squirrels), Xerini (African and some Eurasian ground squirrels), and Protoxerini (African tree squirrels).

Taxonomy
Tribe Xerini six species of ground squirrels in five genera, occurring in Africa and Asia. 
Atlantoxerus
Euxerus
Geosciurus
Spermophilopsis
Xerus
Tribe Protoxerini thirty species of tree squirrels in six genera, occurring in Africa.
Epixerus
Funisciurus
Heliosciurus
Myosciurus
Paraxerus
Protoxerus
Tribe Marmotini ground squirrels in fifteen genera, occurring world wide. Includes the prairie dogs, the marmots (including woodchuck), and chipmunks.
Ammospermophilus
Callospermophilus
Cynomys
Eutamias
Ictidomys
Marmota
Neotamias
Notocitellus
Otospermophilus
Poliocitellus
Sciurotamias
Spermophilus
Tamias
Urocitellus
Xerospermophilus

References

Xerinae
Mammal subfamilies
Taxa named by Henry Fairfield Osborn